Montemonaco is a town and comune (municipality) in Marche  region, located about  north-east from Rome. It is located within Sibillini Mountains, along Aso valley, on a plateau facing the Mount Zampa and  Mount Sibilla. Nearby are located Mount Vector and the Pilatus Lake.

Slightly involved in recent earthquakes, Montemonaco ("MonkMount") takes its name from a Benedictine monastery founded here around the 8th century.

References

Cities and towns in the Marche